Postoloprty is a town in Louny District in the Ústí nad Labem Region of the Czech Republic. It has about 4,600 inhabitants.

Administrative parts

The villages of Březno, Dolejší Hůrky, Hradiště, Levonice, Malnice, Mradice, Rvenice, Seletice, Seménkovice, Skupice, Strkovice and Vrbka are administrative parts of Postoloprty. Dolejší Hůrky forms an exclave of the municipal territory.

Etymology
The town's name was probably derived from the Latin name of the monastery, Porta Apostolorum. Another theory says the name was derived from Old Czech prtati postole, meaning "to repair shoes". The first written mention of Postoloprty was under the name Postolopirth.

Geography
It lies mostly in the Most Basin, in an agricultural landscape. The town is situated on the left bank of the Ohře River.

A distinctive geologic outcrop of the Cretaceous period is located near the village of Březno (Březenské souvrství). Today, it is protected as a nature monument.

History

The settlement was first mentioned in the Chronica Boemorum, written in 1119–1125 by Cosmas of Prague. A Benedictine monastery with the Church of the Blessed Virgin Mary was founded here probably at the end of the 11th century. It was built near the site where a former Slavic gord called Drahúš on the Ohře river had been erected at the behest of the Přemyslid dukes. The monastery's premises were devastated during the Hussite Wars in 1420 and not rebuilt.

In 1454, the Bohemian King George of Poděbrady enfeoffed his sons with the Postoloprty estates. The lands were leased to the noble Veitmile (Weitmühl) family in 1480. During their rule, the settlement prospered, and in 1510, it obtained town privileges by King Vladislaus II. In 1611, the owners had a castle erected at the site of the former monastery, which was rebuilt in the Baroque style from 1706 to 1718. The lordship had passed to the noble House of Schwarzenberg in 1692, the family held the premises until 1945.

Upon the 1938 Munich Agreement, the area was annexed by Nazi Germany and incorporated into the Reichsgau Sudetenland. When the region returned to the Czechoslovak Republic at the end of World War II, the remaining 'Sudeten German' population was expelled according to the Beneš decrees. Outrages culminated in a massacre on 3–7 June 1945, when about 800 German civilians, mainly men who had been deported to Postoloprty from nearby Žatec, were tortured and shot. The incidents were inquired by a committee of the Czechoslovak parliament in 1947. It is the largest known killing of ethnic Germans by Czechs after World War II. 763 bodies were exhumed but other death toll estimates are higher. The Postoloprty citizens disagreed whether to build a memorial or to not acknowledge the massacre; a memorial plaque was unveiled on 3 June 2010.

Demographics

Transport
A section of the D7 motorway passes through the town.

Notable people
Antonín Langweil (1791–1837), artist and model maker
Julius Anton Glaser (1831–1885), Austrian jurist and politician
Eduard Bacher (1846–1908), Austrian jurisconsult and journalist
Adolf Dobrovolný (1864—1934), actor and radio announcer
Jan Burka (1924–2009), artist

Twin towns – sister cities

Postoloprty is twinned with:
 Wolkenstein, Germany

References

External links

Cities and towns in the Czech Republic
Populated places in Louny District